Alice (a.k.a. Alicja) is a 1982 musical-fantasy film co-produced by Belgian and Polish film companies. The film is a modern telling of Lewis Carroll's 1865 Alice's Adventures in Wonderland story and stars French actress Sophie Barjac in the title role. Jean-Pierre Cassel plays the jogger named Rabbit with whom Alice falls in love; Susannah York, Paul Nicholas, Jack Wild, Tracy Hyde, Peter Straker and Dominic Guard all have supporting roles.

The film features a musical score by Henri Seroka and lyrics by Gyllianna. Barjac's vocals were dubbed by the Scottish singer Lulu. The film is relatively obscure despite the participation of well-known talent. It was released on VHS in the United States by Karl-Lorimar Home Video.

External links

1982 films
1982 fantasy films
Films based on Alice in Wonderland
Musical fantasy films
Polish musical films
1980s musical films
Polish fantasy films